Mylabris festiva is a species of blister beetle, belonging to the family Meloidae. It is found in south-eastern Europe.

References 

Meloidae
Beetles described in 1773
Taxa named by Peter Simon Pallas